James Leo Breazeale (born October 3, 1949) is an American former Major League Baseball first baseman.

Breazeale was a highly regarded amateur player at Sam Houston High School in Houston and drew comparisons to fellow Houstonian Rusty Staub.

Breazeale was drafted by the Atlanta Braves with the eighth pick of the first round of the January 1968 Major League Baseball Draft. He played four seasons in the Major Leagues, three with the Braves (–), and one for the Chicago White Sox.

Breazeale began the 1973 season on the injured list until early-June because of an ankle fracture resulting from a December 20, 1972 traffic collision near Uvalde, Texas. The automobile carrying Breazeale and teammate Mike McQueen was struck head-on by a car with a driver who attempted to pass a semi-trailer truck. Prior to the accident, he had been expected to become the starting first baseman, allowing Hank Aaron to play the outfield again.

In his MLB career, Breazeale played 89 games with 179 at bats and 40 hits. He had three home runs, 33 RBIs, 20 runs, and a .223 batting average. He played his final game on July 19, 1978 with the White Sox.

References

External links

1949 births
Living people
Alacranes de Durango players
American expatriate baseball players in Mexico
Appleton Foxes players
Arizona Instructional League Braves players
Atlanta Braves players
Baseball players from Houston
Chicago White Sox players
Greenwood Braves players
Iowa Oaks players
Major League Baseball first basemen
Minor league baseball managers
Richmond Braves players
Shreveport Braves players